Violet Katts (3 January 1919 – 19 September 2007), was an Australian songwriter who published under the name Letty Katts, often spelled Lettie. She is best known for her songs "A Town Like Alice" (1956) and "Never Never" (1945), frequently referred to as "Riding to the Never Never".

History
Katts was born in 1919, the only daughter of Anton Katts (22 January 1888 – March 1952) and Lucretia Katts, née Pimblett, who married on 11 June 1921. Anton was born in Ostrog, Russia, (perhaps Ostrog, Šentjernej) and in 1912 left as a refugee for Australia, and founded a radiator repair and sheet metal fabrication shop "King & Katts" at 623 Wickham Street, Fortitude Valley, Queensland.
 
Around 1925 they built a large house, "Roseneath", in Enoggera where Letty grew up.
Both parents were musicians: Anton played balalaika and mandolin; Lucretia was a pianist, and Katts had private piano tuition, initially with Constance Hartshorn, organist for the Enoggera Presbyterian church, then from around 1930 with John Ellis, who took out a newspaper advertisement when Kitts graduated ATCL and LTCL in 1939.

Katts married John Stanton Davis Mellick (born 22 February 1920), on 8 December 1941. Katts worked as a music teacher while her husband was overseas during the War.

Known as Stanton, or Stan, Mellick, he had a distinguished career in the army, and was promoted to Major. After the war he studied pharmacy, and had a successful practice in the town. He later became a senior lecturer at the University of Queensland and was awarded an OAM in 2005. 
They had one daughter, Jill Mellick (born 29 August 1948).

Compositions
"Never Never" won for her a prize of £100 (perhaps $5,000 in today's money) in a contest conducted by the Australian Federation of Broadcasting Stations in March 1945. The song was regularly performed on Australian radio stations, and topped the "hit parade" for many weeks in 1946. Its first recording was made by Donald Novis with the Bobby Limb orchestra in 1951 and released in Australia in January 1952.
"A Town Like Alice" was written independently of the film A Town Like Alice but Chappell & Co., her publishers, organised for it to be played in conjunction with the film's premiere in Sydney and became the first all-Australian composition to top the hit parade. Its first gramophone recording was by French-Australian Red Perksey and his orchestra, with vocals by Ray Dickson. Many other artists followed, including Slim Dusty, through to Warren H. Williams and Ted Egan 50-odd years later.

Other published compositions include
"I Put My Hand in My Pocket"
Held by the National Library of Australia:
"Riding Home" (piano duet)
"This Is Sydney"
"A Day in the Bush" (eight little songs for children)
"West of the Great Divide"
"The Gallop" (piano duet)
"Toy Soldiers" (piano solo)
"By the Billabong" (piano duet)
"Ship Ahoy" (piano duet)
Two high-profile compositions, mentioned in Narelle McCoy's presentation at the State Library (see External links, below) are:
"This Old Town" for Graham Kennedy
"This Is Sydney" for Barry Crocker
Katts' compositions listed by the Australian Performing Right Association to 13 April 1988 are:
Adelaide
At the End of the Day
Because of You
Bells
Butterflies
By the Billabong
Campbell Town
Climb a Mountain
The Dancers
A Day in the Bush
Dive, Dive, Dive
Doll's Lullaby
The Emu
For Now I Know
Good Morning
Goodnight
Grenfell
I Put My Hands in My Pockets
I Ride Alone
I'll Ask Her
I'm Going Back
The Kangaroo
The Koala
The Kookaburra
Lady Moon
The Little World
Long Shadows
Lost
Love Will Teach You
May Shouldn't Marry December
The Madoke
The Music Box
My Heart's Saying Yes
Never Never [corrected from Never, Never]
Night Song
Now You Are Marching Home
Old Man of the Sea
On the Beach
On the Lake
The Orchid
Our Evermore
The Pedestal Song
Playtime
The Possum
Raindrops
Reading the Paper
Riding Home
The River
S.S. Make Believe
Sailing into the Sunset
Sailors' Song
The See-Saw [corrected from Sea-Saw]
Ship Ahoy
The Shiralee
Sunshine Express
Tender Loving Care
There's Beauty Everywhere
They Also Serve
They Can't Ration Love
This Is Sydney
This Old Town
The Timeless Land
A Town Like Alice

Recognition
The State Library of Queensland now holds the Letty Katts collection, 1935-2006. This collection documents the creative life of the Queensland composer and comprises compositions, arrangements, correspondence, certificates, newspaper clippings, personal items, video and sound recordings.

The biennial Letty Katts Award was established by Stan Mellick in 2016 to support research into Queensland's music history, and consists of a grant of $5,000 plus three months' access to the Neil Roberts Research Lounge at the State Library of Queensland and free access to documents held by the library. 
In 2020 it was awarded to Narelle McCoy, whose thesis was "Musicians Should Be Heard and Not Seen: the life and music of Letty Katts".

Notes and references 

1919  births
2007  deaths
Australian songwriters
Australian women composers

External links
Letty Katts Award, State Library of Queensland.
Presentation by Narelle McCoy at the State Library of Queensland. Research Reveals: Musicians Should Be Heard and Not Seen: the life and music of Letty Katts (1919-2007). (Vimeo footage)
Who is Letty Katts? John Oxley Library Blog, State Library of Queensland. 
1938: A Cook's Tour through Europe and the U.S.A. with the Katts Family, John Oxley Library Blog, State Library of Queensland.